Peter Marvin Alexander (born July 29, 1976) is an American journalist and television presenter who currently works for NBC News. He obtained the title of NBC News White House correspondent covering the White House and the President of the United States in December 2012. 

In October 2018, he was named co-anchor of Today for Saturday episodes. His reports appear across all platforms of NBC News, including NBC Nightly News, Today, Meet the Press, Dateline NBC, MSNBC and NBCNews.com. He shares duties alongside Kristen Welker as the network's co-chief White House correspondent and as co-anchor of Weekend Today, the Saturday edition of Today. His sister Rebecca Alexander is a psychotherapist living in New York City.

Early life
Alexander was born on July 29, 1976, to a Jewish family in Oakland, California, the son of Terry (née Pink) and David Alexander, an attorney. Alexander is a graduate of Northwestern University's Medill School of Journalism.

Career
Since arriving at NBC News in 2004, Alexander has covered many international stories—from Iraq's historic election in  2005 to the death of Osama bin Laden in Pakistan, and the tsunami in Indonesia. He has filed reports from Afghanistan, the Galápagos Islands, Gaza Strip, Israel, Laos and Mexico. Alexander's work also includes environmental reporting from the Northwest Passage in the Arctic, and reports on the deeply personal story of his sister, Rebecca, who has Usher Syndrome, type III, a rare genetic disorder that is robbing her of her vision and her hearing.

Alexander has covered numerous breaking news events, including anchoring live coverage of the "Miracle on the Hudson" and the Virginia Tech shooting. In 2010, he reported on the international controversy surrounding WikiLeaks and its founder Julian Assange. In addition to his news responsibilities, Alexander has also served as an NBC Sports host, and covered both the 2008 Beijing Olympic Games and the 2010 Winter Olympics.

White House correspondent
Alexander served as a White House correspondent from 2012 to March 2014. He covered the Presidency of Barack Obama, traveling across the world with the president. As Alexander is based in Washington, D.C., he still frequently reports from the White House.

On March 20, 2020, he attended a live White House briefing held on steps the federal and state governments were undertaking to respond to the COVID-19 pandemic in the United States. President Donald Trump stated he had a "good feeling" and was "hopeful" about the potential effectiveness against coronavirus of certain older drug therapies such as chloroquine that have been effective on other conditions. Alexander asked: "Is it possible that your impulse to put a positive spin on things may be giving Americans a false sense of hope?" President Trump answered that it was important to communicate hopeful therapies that are being investigated. Alexander further questioned the president: "What do you say to Americans who are scared, though? I guess, nearly 200 dead, 14,000 who are sick, millions, as you witnessed, who are scared right now. What do you say to Americans who are watching you right now who are scared?" Trump replied, "I say that you are a terrible reporter, that's what I say. I think it's a very nasty question. I think it's a very bad signal that you are putting out to the American people. They're looking for answers and they're looking for hope. And you're doing sensationalism." Some news organizations and commentators harshly criticized this response to what they described as a "softball question."

Weekend Today 
Alexander had previously been filling in on the show for Craig Melvin, who recently left his role as co-host of the Saturday morning version of Today to join the weekday edition and continue his hosting duties on MSNBC Live With Craig Melvin. He will continue his roles of a national correspondent and a White House correspondent.

Personal life
Alexander's parents are divorced. He has two younger twin siblings (born February 4, 1979): Kevin Alexander and psychotherapist Rebecca Alexander, who has Usher syndrome type III. By his father, he has a half-sister, Lauren. On April 21, 2012, Alexander married Alison Starling, an anchor at WJLA-TV (Washington, D.C.'s ABC affiliate). The couple has two children and lives in the suburbs of Washington D.C.

Accolades
He was nominated for the Outstanding Live Coverage of a Breaking News StoryLong Form News & Documentary Emmy Award for his participation in the NBC News Special Report: The Death of Pope John Paul II (2005) news documentary.

See also

 List of American journalists
 List of television reporters

References

External links
 

American television reporters and correspondents
NBC News people
Jewish American journalists
Medill School of Journalism alumni
1976 births
Living people
Journalists from Oakland, California
21st-century American Jews